The 2021 Premios Juventud ceremony took place July 22, 2021. Univision broadcast the show live from the Watsco Center, with Alejandra Espinoza hosting the event. Premios Juventud aims to inspire, motivate and empower Latino youth to become leaders for change. The awards celebrate the current trends in pop culture, music, digital, fashion, television and social media. Daddy Yankee was honored with the "Agent Of Change" award.

Performers

Winners and nominees

Winners will be revealed on July 22 and winners will be in bold.

The New Generation - Female
Kali Uchis
Chesca
Daniela Darcourt
Elena Rose
La Ross María
María Becerra
Nathy Peluso
Nicki Nicole
VF7
Yahaira Plasencia

The New Generation - Male
Jay Wheeler
Alex Rose
Fran Rozzano
Guaynaa
Khea
Llane
Manny Cruz
Mati Gómez
Mora
Rochy RD

The New Generation - Regional Mexican
Los Dos Carnales
Eslabon Armado
Ingrid Contreras
Jessi Uribe
Junior H
Las Marías
Los Nuevos Federales
Marca MP
Nuevo Elemento
Yeison Jiménez

Best Mariachi Song - Ranchera
'Dime Cómo Quieres' – Christian Nodal & Ángela Aguilar
'El Alumno' – Joss Favela & Jessi Uribe
'El Tiempo No Perdona' – Alex Fernández
'No Andes Con Nadie' – Nuevo Elemento
'Para No Extrañarte Tanto' – Ana Bárbara
'Pobre Corazón' – Ingrid Contreras
'Te Olvidé' – Alejandro Fernández
'Tu Amante' – Yeison Jiménez
'Ya No Insistas Corazón' – Vicente Fernández
'Y Si Me Vuelvo a Enamorar' – Jary Franco

Best Regional Mexican Song
'El Envidioso' – Los Dos Carnales
'Barquillero' – Calibre 50
'Borracho de Cochera' – El Fantasma
'En Otro Canal' – La Fiera de Ojinaga
'Otra Borrachera' – Gerardo Ortiz

Best Regional Mexican Collaboration
'El Güero' – Grupo Firme Ft. Marca MP
'Ca… y Vago' – El Fantasma Ft. Los Dos Carnales
'Contra Mis Principios' – Lenin Ramírez & Remmy Valenzuela
'Somos Los Que Somos' – Los 2 de la S & Banda MS de Sergio Lizárraga
'Y la Hice Llorar' – Los Ángeles Azules Ft. Abel Pintos

Best Regional Mexican Fusion
'El Cambio' – Chesca & Grupo Firme
'100 Años' – Carlos Rivera, Maluma & Calibre 50
'Botella Tras Botella' – Gera MX & Christian Nodal
'Cumbia a La Gente' – Guaynaa & Los Ángeles Azules
'Que Se Sepa Nuestro Amor' – Mon Laferte & Alejandro Fernández
'Tuyo y Mío' – Camilo & Los Dos Carnales

Tropical Mix (Song with the Best Tropical Collaboration)
'Antes Que Salga el Sol' – Natti Natasha & Prince Royce
'Bebé' – Camilo & El Alfa
'De Vuelta Pa' La Vuelta' – Daddy Yankee & Marc Anthony
'Tú Vas a Tener Que Explicarme' (Remix) – La Ross María & Romeo Santos
'Víctimas Las Dos' – Víctor Manuelle & La India

Most Powerful Message Video (Video with the best social message)
'Un Día (One Day)' – J Balvin, Dua Lipa, Bad Bunny & Tainy
'Cuando Estés Aquí' – Pablo Alborán
'Cuenta Conmigo' – Mike Bahía, Llane, PJ Sin Suela Ft. Mozart La Para
'Girasoles '– Luis Fonsi
'Tan Bonita' – Piso 21

La Mezcla Perfecta (Song with the Best Collaboration)
'Relación' (Remix) – Sech, Daddy Yankee, J Balvin, Rosalía & Farruko
'Agua' – Tainy & J Balvin
'Caramelo' (Remix) – Ozuna, Karol G & Myke Towers
'Chica Ideal' – Sebastián Yatra & Guaynaa
'Fútbol y Rumba' – Anuel AA Ft. Enrique Iglesias
'Honey Boo' – CNCO & Natti Natasha
'Mala Costumbre' – Manuel Turizo & Wisin y Yandel
'Mi Niña' (Remix) – Wisin, Myke Towers, Maluma Ft. Anitta & Los Legendarios
'Porfa' (Remix) – Feid, Justin Quiles, J Balvin Ft. Maluma, Nicky Jam & Sech
'Titanic' – Kany García & Camilo

OMG Collaboration (Collaboration with an Anglo artist)
'Hawái' (Remix) – Maluma & The Weeknd
'Baila Conmigo' – Selena Gomez & Rauw Alejandro
'Beautiful Boy' – Karol G, Ludacris & Emilee
'Del Mar' – Ozuna, Doja Cat & Sia
'Mamacita' – Black Eyed Peas, Ozuna & J Rey Soul
'Me Gusta' – Anitta Ft. Cardi B & Myke Towers
'TKN' – Rosalía & Travis Scott
'Top Gone' – Lil Mosey & Lunay
'Un Día (One Day)' – J Balvin, Dua Lipa, Bad Bunny & Tainy
'X' – Jonas Brothers Ft. Karol G

Viral Track of the Year (Song with the fastest rise in social media)
'Dákiti' – Bad Bunny & Jhay Cortez
'Con Tus Besos' – Eslabon Armado
'De Vuelta Pa' La Vuelta' – Daddy Yankee & Marc Anthony
'Dime Cómo Quieres' – Christian Nodal & Ángela Aguilar
'El Envidioso' – Los Dos Carnales
'Hawái' – Maluma
'La Jeepeta' (Remix) – Nio García, Anuel AA, Myke Towers, Brray & Juanka
'Relación' (Remix) – Sech, Daddy Yankee, J Balvin, Rosalía & Farruko
'Tú' – Carin León
'Vida De Rico' – Camilo

Male Youth Artist of the Year
Bad Bunny
Camilo
Christian Nodal
Daddy Yankee
El Fantasma
J Balvin
Lunay
Maluma
Myke Towers
Prince Royce

Female Youth Artist of the Year
Karol G
Becky G
Cazzu
Chiquis
Farina
Kany García
Mariah Angeliq
Nathy Peluso
Natti Natasha
Rosalía

Favorite Group or Duo of the Year
Grupo Firme
Calibre 50
CNCO
Los Ángeles Azules
Los Dos Carnales
Mau y Ricky
N'Klabe
Piso 21
Reik
Zion y Lennox

Album of the Year
'El Último Tour Del Mundo' – Bad Bunny
'Alter Ego' – Prince Royce
'Déja Vu' – CNCO
'KG0516' – Karol G
'Los Legendarios 001' – Los Legendarios
'Mesa Para Dos' – Kany García
'Mi Manos' – Camilo
'Munay' – Pedro Capó
'Papi Juancho' – Maluma
'Una Niña Inútil' – Cazzu

References

2021 music awards
2021 awards in the United States
2021 in Latin music